Maniatis can refer to:

Surname
Giannis Maniatis, Greek international football (soccer) player
Kostas Maniatis, professional football (soccer) goalkeeper
Tom Maniatis, professor of molecular and cellular biology
Peter Maniatis, TV host and boxing promoter

Place name
Maniatis, a village in the community of Dafni, Arcadia, Greece